One Wild Night is a 1938 American comedy film directed by Eugene Forde and written by Charles Belden and Jerome Cady. The film stars June Lang, Dick Baldwin, Lyle Talbot, J. Edward Bromberg, Sidney Toler and Andrew Tombes. The film was released on June 10, 1938, by 20th Century Fox.

Plot
Four men withdraw large quantities of money from the same bank and then disappear, now reporter Jewel and crime student Jimmy Nolan investigate the possible extortion ring.

Cast     
June Lang as Gale Gibson aka Jennifer Jewel
Dick Baldwin as Jimmy Nolan
Lyle Talbot as Singer Martin
J. Edward Bromberg as Norman
Sidney Toler as Lawton
Andrew Tombes as Police Chief William Nolan
William Demarest as Editor Collins
Romaine Callender as Ogden Hepple
Jan Duggan as Mrs. Halliday
Spencer Charters as Lem Halliday
Harlan Briggs as Mayor

References

External links 
 

1938 films
20th Century Fox films
American comedy films
1938 comedy films
Films directed by Eugene Forde
American black-and-white films
1930s English-language films
1930s American films
English-language comedy films